Clathrocyclas elegans is a species of radiolarians in the family Theoperidae.

References

External links 

Protists described in 1990
Polycystines